In statistics, Wold's decomposition or the Wold representation theorem (not to be confused with the Wold theorem that is the discrete-time analog of the Wiener–Khinchin theorem),  named after Herman Wold, says that every covariance-stationary time series  can be written as the sum of two time series, one deterministic and one stochastic.

Formally

where:

 is the time series being considered,

 is an uncorrelated sequence which is the innovation process to the process  – that is, a white noise process that is input to the linear filter .

 is the possibly infinite vector of moving average weights (coefficients or parameters)

 is a deterministic time series, such as one represented by a sine wave.

The moving average coefficients have these properties:

 Stable, that is square summable  < 
 Causal (i.e. there are no terms with j < 0)
 Minimum delay
 Constant ( independent of t)
 It is conventional to define 

This theorem can be considered as an existence theorem: any stationary process has this seemingly special representation.  Not only is the existence of such a simple linear and exact representation remarkable, but even more so is the special nature of the moving average model.  Imagine creating a process that is a moving average but not satisfying these properties 1–4.  For example, the coefficients  could define an acausal and  model.  Nevertheless the theorem assures the existence of a causal  that exactly represents this process.  How this all works for the case of causality and the minimum delay property is discussed in Scargle (1981), where an extension of the Wold Decomposition is discussed.

The usefulness of the Wold Theorem is that it allows the dynamic evolution of a variable  to be approximated by a linear model. However, when  is merely an uncorrelated but not independent sequence, then the linear model exists but it is not the only representation of the dynamic dependence of the series. However, in practical time series analysis, it is often the case that only linear predictors are considered, partly on the grounds of simplicity, in which case the Wold decomposition is directly relevant.

The Wold representation depends on an infinite number of parameters, although in practice they usually decay rapidly. The autoregressive model is an alternative that may have only a few coefficients if the corresponding moving average has many.  These two models can be combined into an autoregressive-moving average (ARMA) model, or an autoregressive-integrated-moving average (ARIMA) model if non-stationarity is involved.  See  and references there; in addition this paper gives an extension of the Wold Theorem that allows more generality for the moving average (not necessarily stable, causal, or minimum delay) accompanied by a sharper characterization of the innovation (identically and independently distributed, not just uncorrelated). This extension allows the possibility of models that are more faithful to physical or astrophysical processes, and in particular can sense ″the arrow of time.″

References
 
 
 
 Wold, H. (1954) A Study in the Analysis of Stationary Time Series, Second revised edition, with an Appendix on "Recent Developments in Time Series Analysis" by Peter Whittle. Almqvist and Wiksell Book Co., Uppsala.

Theorems in statistics
Time series